Semerovo is a village and municipality in the Nové Zámky District in the Nitra Region of south-west Slovakia.

History
In historical records the village was first mentioned in 1210.

Geography
The municipality lies at an altitude of 150 metres and covers an area of 23.409 km². It has a population of about 1250 people.

Ethnicity
The population is about 96% Slovak and 3% Hungarian, with other small ethnic minorities, mainly gypsy. There was once a sizable Jewish population consisting of several families; all of them were deported to concentration camps during the years of World War II. There is a small Jewish cemetery on the village's outskirts.

Facilities
The village has a small public library a gym and a football pitch, and a Roman Catholic church whose base stone dates from the 9th century.

External links
 http://www.statistics.sk/mosmis/eng/run.html
 Semerovo – Nové Zámky Okolie

Villages and municipalities in Nové Zámky District